Kit Kat (stylised as KitKat in various countries) is a chocolate-covered wafer bar confection created by Rowntree's of York, United Kingdom, and is now produced globally by Nestlé (which acquired Rowntree's in 1988), except in the United States, where it is made under licence by the H. B. Reese Candy Company, a division of the Hershey Company (an agreement Rowntree's first made with Hershey in 1970).

The standard bars consist of two or four pieces composed of three layers of wafer, separated and covered by an outer layer of chocolate. Each finger can be snapped from the bar separately. There are many flavours of Kit Kat, including milk, white, and dark chocolate.

The original four-finger version of the bar was developed after a worker at Rowntree's York factory put a suggestion in the recommendation box for "a chocolate bar that a man could take to work in his pack up". It was launched in September 1935 in the UK as Rowntree's Chocolate Crisp, and the later two-finger version was launched in 1936. It was renamed Kit Kat Chocolate Crisp in 1937, and just Kit Kat after World War II. 

Since making its first television appearance in a UK commercial in 1958, the slogan for the Kit Kat in the UK and elsewhere has been "Have a break... have a Kit Kat". Since 1986 in the U.S., the jingle used in television advertisements has been "Gimme a break, Gimme a break, Break me off a piece of that Kit Kat bar!"

History 

Use of the name Kit Kat or Kit Cat for a type of food goes back to the 18th century, when mutton pies known as a Kit Kat were served at meetings of the political Kit-Cat Club in London owned by pastry chef Christopher Cat.

The origins of what is now known as the Kit Kat brand go back to 1911, when Rowntree's, a confectionery company based in York, England, trademarked the terms Kit Cat and Kit Kat. The names were not used immediately and Kit Kat first appeared in the 1920s, when Rowntree's launched a brand of boxed chocolates entitled Kit Cat. This continued into the 1930s, when Rowntree's shifted focus and production onto its Black Magic and Dairy Box brands. With the promotion of alternative products, the Kit Cat brand decreased and was eventually discontinued. The original four-finger bar was developed after a worker at Rowntree's York Factory put a suggestion in a recommendation box for a snack that "a man could take to work in his pack". The bar was officially launched on 29 August 1935, under the title of Rowntree's Chocolate Crisp (priced at 2d), and was sold in London and throughout southern England.

Rowntree's Chocolate Crisp was renamed Kit Kat Chocolate Crisp in 1937. The colour scheme and first flavour variation to the brand came in 1942, owing to World War II, when food shortages prompted an alteration in the recipe. The flavour of Kit Kat was changed to dark chocolate; the packaging abandoned its Chocolate Crisp title, and was coloured blue. After the war the name became Kit Kat, with the original milk chocolate recipe and red packaging.

Following its success in the United Kingdom, in the 1940s Kit Kat was exported to Canada, South Africa, Ireland, Australia, and New Zealand. In 1957, Donald Gilles, the executive at JWT London, created the iconic advertising line "Have a Break, Have a Kit Kat". The brand further expanded in the 1970s when Rowntree created a new distribution factory in Germany to meet European demand and established agreements to distribute the brand in the US through the Hershey company, and in Japan through Fujiya.

In June 1988, Swiss company Nestlé acquired Kit Kat through the purchase of Rowntree's, giving Nestlé global control over the brand, except in the US, and production and distribution increased with new facilities in Japan and additional manufacturing operations set up in Malaysia, India and China.

The Hershey Company has a licence to produce Kit Kat bars in the United States which dates from 1970, when Hershey executed a licensing agreement with Rowntree which allowed Hershey to retain the Kit Kat licence so long as Hershey was not sold. Nestlé, which has a substantial presence in the US, had to honour the licensing agreement when it bought Rowntree in 1988. As Kit Kat is one of Hershey's top five brands in the US market, the Kit Kat licence was a key factor in Hershey's failed attempt to attract a serious buyer in 2002. Even Nestlé rejected Hershey's asking price. Nestlé's sale of its US confectionery business to Ferrara Candy Company in 2018 did not impact the Kit Kat bar, and thus rights would revert directly to Nestlé and not Ferrara in the event of a sale of Hershey.

Variants in the traditional chocolate bar first appeared in 1996 when Kit Kat Orange, the first flavour variant, was introduced in the UK. Its success was followed by several varieties including mint and caramel, and in 1999 Kit Kat Chunky was launched and received favourably by international consumers. Variations on the traditional Kit Kat have continued to be developed since then. In 2000, Nestlé acquired Fujiya's share of the brand in Japan, and also expanded its marketplace in Japan, Russia, Turkey, and Venezuela, in addition to markets in Eastern and Central Europe.  Throughout the decade, Kit Kat introduced dozens of flavours and line extensions within specific consumer markets. In September 2010, Kit Kat (and Aero) celebrated its 75th anniversary. Nestlé stated, "Since that momentous day in 1935, Kit Kat has firmly established itself in British culture, spreading its chocolate fingers far and wide that is sold in more countries than any other chocolate brand".

A two-finger bar was launched in the 1930s, and has remained the company's best-selling biscuit brand ever since. Kit Kat bars contain varying numbers of fingers depending on the market, ranging from the half-finger sized Kit Kat Petit in Japan, to the three-fingered variants in Arabia, and the twelve-finger family-size bars in Australia and France. Kit Kat bars are sold individually and in bags, boxes and multi-packs.

Global confection 

Kit Kat bars are produced in 16 countries by Nestlé: Brazil, Mexico, United Kingdom, Canada, Australia, New Zealand, South Africa, Germany, Russia, Japan, China, Malaysia, Thailand, India, Turkey, United Arab Emirates, Bulgaria, and Algeria. Kit Kat bars in the United States are produced under licence by The Hershey Company, a Nestlé competitor, due to a prior licensing agreement with Rowntree.
The year 2003 was a turning point for the Kit Kat bar as well as the confectionery industry in general. The popularity of low carb diets, and the push to healthier eating stifled sales growth in many parts of the world. In addition, fierce competition from Cadbury's newly formed Dairy Milk superbrand also contributed to Kit Kat sales decreasing considerably in its home market of the UK, and threatened to depose it from its No.1 position. The solution adopted by Nestlé and others was to increase dramatically the number of new and unique variations of their confections and market them as limited or special editions, usually only available for a few months at a time so as not lose sales of their standard products. The strategy initially reversed the decline of the Kit Kat and has been adopted worldwide by Nestlé, Hershey, Mars, and others with similar success. This has resulted in many new flavours and varieties of the Kit Kat and other confections appearing globally since then.

In September 2006, Nestlé announced that they would be cutting 645 jobs in their York factory and moving all Smarties production to their Hamburg factory, which had already been producing two-thirds. They stated that this move would allow for a £20 million investment to modernise the antiquated York factory and improve Kit Kat production. In 2010, a new £5 million manufacturing line was opened by Nestlé in York, to produce more than one billion Kit Kat bars each year.

As dark chocolate has seen increased demand and favour worldwide because of its purported health benefits, in September 2006 the four-finger Kit Kat Fine Dark was launched in the United Kingdom as a permanent product. Hershey had sold the four-finger Kit Kat Dark in the US several years previously as a limited edition, and began doing so again.

Nestlé now manufactures two-finger Kit Kats with natural flavourings, and in February 2021 announced the rollout of the first vegan Kit Kat, called "KitKat V". In 2014, Kit Kat was ranked the third best selling chocolate bar in the United Kingdom, after Dairy Milk and Galaxy. 
Sometimes considered a biscuit, in 2020 sales of Kit Kats were second to McVitie's biscuits in the UK in the biscuit category.

Design 
When first introduced in the United Kingdom in 1935, the original Rowntree's Chocolate Crisp bar had a red wrapper, which briefly became blue between 1945 and 1947. The Kit Kat logo was added in 1937. As a result of milk shortages after the end of World War II – a period of rationing in the UK – dark chocolate was used instead of milk chocolate during that period.

Since its introduction into the US in the 1970s, the Hershey's Kit Kat packaging and advertising has differed from the branding used in every other country where it was sold. In 2002, Hershey Kit Kats adopted the slanted ellipse logo used worldwide by Nestlé, though the ellipse was red and the text white. The US version of "Kit Kat Chunky" is known as "Big Kat".

In the United Kingdom, the product was traditionally wrapped in silver foil and an outer paper band. In 2001 this was changed to flow wrap plastic. Foil and paper wrapping is still used for Kit Kats sold as part of a multipack. In 2020, Kit Kat won the Lausanne Index Prize - Best of Packaging.

Marketing and promotion

Advertising 

After launching in the 1930s, Rowntree's Chocolate Crisp was originally advertised as "the biggest little meal" and "the perfect companion to a cup of tea". During World War II, Kit Kat was depicted as a valuable wartime foodstuff, with the slogan "what active people need". The first Kit Kat poster appeared in 1951, and the brand made its first television appearance in a UK commercial in 1958. The first colour TV advertisement appeared in 1969.

Since 1957, the slogan for the Kit Kat in the UK and elsewhere has been "Have a break... have a Kit Kat". However, in 1995, Nestlé sought to trademark the "Have a break" portion. After a ten-year legal battle, which was contested by rival Mars, the European Court of Justice ruled on 7 July 2005 to send the case back to the British courts. In 2004, Nestlé UK used the slogan "Make the most of your break", but later returned to the original slogan.

The United States also used the short-lived slogan, "Tastes So Good, You'll Roar", in the early 1980s. The TV commercial most known from this slogan involves a young man biting into one of the Kit Kat bars in a grocery store, and roaring like a lion so loudly the whole store shakes violently, knocking items from the shelves. Another short-lived US slogan was "That's What You Want", whose television adverts showed people pulling unlikely foodstuffs from their pockets or purses, before rejecting them in favour of a Kit Kat. The "classic" American version of the "Gimme a Break" Kit Kat jingle (in use in the US since 1986) was written by Ken Shuldman (copy) and Michael A. Levine (music) for the DDB Advertising Agency. Versions of the original have been covered by Carrie Underwood, Shawn Colvin, and many studio singers, as well as people who have appeared on-camera in the commercials. The jingle was cited in a study by University of Cincinnati researcher James J. Kellaris as one of the top ten "earworms" – bits of melody that become stuck in your head. Another version of the advertising jingle 'Gimme a break' created for Kit Kat "Factory" commercial in the US was an original recording by Andrew W.K. W.K. was hired to write a new musical version for their "Gimme a break" slogan. Variations on the Andrew W.K. advertisement included executive dance routines in corporate offices and a network newsroom. However, the "classic" song has also been used again since the newer version first aired in 2004.

Many adverts were worldwide hits among them in the 1980s with Ken Campbell in an advert with Heaven and Hell with Devil and Angel on Television. In Australia, TV ads for Kit Kat featured the classic children's show Thunderbirds, which played off the catchphrase "Thunderbirds Are Go" but instead sees one of the members enjoying a Kit Kat "Break." A 1989 UK television commercial for Kit Kat, in which a zoo photographer "takes a break" from waiting for pandas to appear in an enclosure and misses them performing a dance routine, came in 30th in Channel 4's "The 100 Greatest TV Ads" poll in 2000.

In late 2004 through to the end of 2006, Nestlé Rowntree sponsored the English football club York City F.C. As a result, the club's home-ground, Bootham Crescent, was renamed to KitKat Crescent. The Maltese tour boat MV Lady Davinia had a distinctive red and white Kit Kat paint scheme before she sank in 2008.

In a 2012 advertising campaign in the UK and Ireland, several new flavours of Chunky Kit Kat were marketed, with consumers being asked to vote for their favourite. Selecting from white chocolate, double chocolate, peanut butter, and orange, Peanut butter was the winner by having 47% of votes. A similar campaign occurred in 2013 with mint, coconut, hazelnut and chocolate fudge.

Association with Android 

In September 2013, it was announced that version 4.4 of Google's Android mobile operating system would be named "KitKat". Google licensed the name from Nestlé, with no money changing hands. A promotion ran in numerous countries with specially branded Android Kit Kat bars to win Nexus 7 devices and Google Play Store credit.

Fairtrade 
In December 2009, it was announced that the four-finger variety of Kit Kat would use Fairtrade chocolate (at least in Britain and Ireland) from January 2010. The Fairtrade Kit Kat promotion was extended to the two-finger edition in January 2010.

In June 2020, Nestle announced that KitKat was to end its relationship with the non-profit organisation, Fairtrade, instead choosing to source its cocoa for KitKat chocolate bars from farms with a Rainforest Alliance accreditation.

Golden ticket draw 
In the first three weeks of Big Brother Series 7 in the UK, Channel 4 conducted a promotion in conjunction with Nestlé to distribute 100 "golden tickets" randomly throughout Kit Kats, in a style reminiscent of the Charlie and the Chocolate Factory story. Members of the public finding these tickets were permitted to use them to give themselves a chance to become a Big Brother housemate and bypass the standard auditions process.

Golden ticket holders were invited to a television show where one of them, Susie Verrico, was chosen to enter the House by Aisleyne Horgan-Wallace, picking a ball out of a machine at random. This contest caused some controversy, with the Advertising Standards Authority saying that the terms and conditions of the draw should have been made clearer in related advertisements, and that an independent adjudicator should have been present before and during the draw.

Varieties

Flavours 

Many varieties of Kit Kat have existed, either permanently or as limited editions, such as those sold to commemorate festivals such as Valentine's Day. In Japan, Nestlé has introduced over 300 different flavours since 2000, including ginger ale, soy sauce, creme brulee, green tea, sake, and banana. The flavours are designed to appeal to younger buyers, and are often bought as good-luck gifts as the brand name echoes the Japanese phrase "Kitto Katsu", roughly translating as "surely win."
The Kit Kat Orange was the first flavour variant to be introduced in the United Kingdom, in 1996 and 1998 in Ireland. It was followed in 1997 by the Kit Kat Dark and Kit Kat Mint. All three were available as permanent editions of the two-finger multipack in the United Kingdom, along with the Kit Kat Original, the Kit Kat White, and from 2012 the Kit Kat Cookies & Cream.

A wide variety of promotional items exist, ranging from traditional merchandise (such as mugs, pens, oven gloves and tea-towels) to less common items such as coats for small dogs. In Japan, Kit Kats have come packaged with CD singles, and a special limited edition double pack of Kit Kat Crispy Monogatari came bundled with a mini book featuring six short stories, one of which was written by Koji Suzuki, author of the Ring cycle series. In Japan, Kit Kats are also available in jars that are dispensed from vending machines.

Kit Kat introduced two new flavors to the United States in 2020: Lemon Crisp and Raspberry Creme. The new flavours are available in regular sized bars or miniature bars. In 2020, Nestlé launched a new flavor, Scotch whisky KitKats, available only in Japan using chocolate aged for six months in whisky barrels in Scotland. In February 2021, the company announced it will be launching a vegan, dairy-free version of their popular KitKat product. The bar will be called KitKat V and it will be available in select countries in late 2021 and then expand worldwide.

Forms 

The 'standard' Kit Kat finger bars can come in a variety of presentations and nutritional values. The bars can come in a miniature form of two finger mini bars, or a larger standard four, or in some cases, three, fingered bars.

The standard size has been upgraded in several cases up to a 'monster Size' bar, which can include up to five or eight fingers. Large single-fingered "Chunky Kit Kats" were launched in the United Kingdom in 1998 and have been sold in a variety of flavours. The market for Chunky Kit Kats has also expanded to Canada.

Other forms and shapes include "Choc'n'Go" individually wrapped fingers in France, a twelve-finger "Family Block" available in New Zealand and Australia, round bite-sized "Pop Choc" pieces, square "Kubes", praline-filled "Senses", a yoghurt with Kit Kat pieces, and a Kit Kat ice cream cone.

In the 1980s, a Kit Kat with five shorter fingers was sold in vending machines in the UK. The Japanese Bake 'N Tasty Mini Kit Kats Custard Pudding Flavour was launched in 2014. The bar must be baked in an oven before consumption, and the surface sugar caramelises in the process.

In 2015, a new luxury and giftable variant of Kit Kat called Kit Kat Rubies was launched in Malaysia. Comes with the box of 20 small bars, the Kit Kat Rubies bar made with the premium chocolate truffle cream and imported roasted hazelnut pieces.

As of 2017, U.S. variants include the standard and king-size four-finger bars, standard bars covered with white or dark chocolate, snack-size orange-covered bars for Halloween, bagged wrapped one-finger miniatures (original and assorted), unwrapped minis, a redesigned Big Kat, and a king-size Big Kat (two of the new Big Kat bars).

Chocolatory 

Kit Kat has opened a Chocolatory in the Melbourne Central Shopping Centre in Melbourne, Australia. There is also one in Sydney. The shops allow customers to use touch screens to create their own Kit Kat from a selection of chocolates and ingredients; they are made while the customers wait, and customers can mix their own flavours with some Kit Kat that has been provided in store.

There are similar locations in Brazil, Japan and Canada.

Criticisms and controversies 
In March 2010, Kit Kat was targeted for a boycott by Greenpeace for using palm oil, which the environmental organisation claimed resulted in destruction of forest habitats for orangutans in Indonesia. A YouTube video by Greenpeace went viral and Nestlé announced a partnership with The Forest Trust to establish "responsible sourcing guidelines" and ensure that its products did not have a deforestation footprint. They aimed to achieve a fully sustainable method of palm oil harvesting by 2015. Nestlé states that 58% of palm oil purchased in 2017 was responsibly sourced.

Ingredients 
Original Kit Kat ingredients unless otherwise stated, listed by decreasing weight: milk chocolate (sugar, milk ingredients, cocoa butter, cocoa mass, whey powder, lactose, soya lecithin, polyglycerol polyricinoleate, natural flavour), wheat flour, sugar, modified palm oil, cocoa, sodium bicarbonate, soya lecithin, yeast,  and natural flavour.

Europe 
Milk chocolate (66%) (sugar, cocoa butter, cocoa mass, dried whole milk, cocoa mass, lactose and proteins from whey, whey powder, emulsifier (sunflower lecithin), butterfat, flavouring), wheat flour, sugar, vegetable fat, cocoa mass, yeast, raising agent (sodium bicarbonate), salt, emulsifier (soya lecithin), flavourings.

In 2006, the UK four-finger Kit Kat contained 233 dietary calories (kcal) (975 kilojoules). In 2009, the two-finger Kit Kat contained 107 calories.

In 2013, the UK Kit Kat Chunky contained 247 calories which reduced to 207 calories in 2015. This correlated to a reduction in weight by 19% from 48 g to 40 g.

United States 
Hershey's Kit Kat Crisp Wafers in Chocolate contain sugar, wheat flour, cocoa butter, nonfat milk, chocolate, refined palm kernel oil, lactose (milk), milk fat, contains 2% or less of: soy lecithin, PGPR (emulsifier), yeast, artificial flavor, salt, and sodium bicarbonate.

Canada 
Milk chocolate (sugar, milk ingredients, cocoa butter, cocoa mass, whey powder, lactose, soya lecithin, polyglycerol polyricinoleate, natural flavour), wheat flour, sugar, modified palm oil, cocoa, sodium bicarbonate, soya lecithin, yeast, natural flavour.

Dark chocolate: cocoa mass, sugar, wheat flour, palm kernel, palm, coconut and vegetable oils, modified milk ingredients, cocoa butter, sunflower and soy lecithins, yeast, sodium bicarbonate, calcium sulphate, salt, protease, xylanase, natural flavours.

Asia 

In Japan, Kit Kats are produced at Nestlé-owned factories in Himeji and Kasumigaura.  The milk chocolate used for Kit Kats is made from whole-milk powder and Nestlé buys most of its cacao beans from West Africa.

Nestlé has factories in various locations in China, to supply to China and Hong Kong. During the 2008 Chinese milk scandal, where melamine was found to have tainted some milk suppliers in China, importers in Hong Kong chose to import bars manufactured in the United Kingdom.

See also 
 Kit Kats in Japan
 Kvikk Lunsj

References

External links 

 

Biscuit brands
British confectionery
Nestlé brands
The Hershey Company brands
Products introduced in 1935
Rowntree's brands
Yorkshire cuisine
Chocolate bars
Brand name confectionery